Edmund Marsden (18 April 1881 – 26 May 1915) was an English British Army officer and cricketer. He played for Gloucestershire in 1909. He received his first commission as a second lieutenant in the Indian Staff Corps on 20 January 1900 and served with the 19 Madras Infantry. He was promoted to lieutenant on 20 April 1902.

References

1881 births
1915 deaths
English cricketers
Gloucestershire cricketers
Cricketers from Chennai
19th-century sportsmen
English cricketers of 1890 to 1918
Indian Army personnel killed in World War I
Indian Staff Corps officers
Military personnel of British India
British people in colonial India